Zhang Nanyang was a famed Ming Chinese stone gardener.

He was employed by Pan Yunduan in the construction of the original Yu Garden, although it is questionable whether the current rockeries are his work.

References

Artists from Shanghai
Ming dynasty artists